Nikola Dubois (born 1977) is an Australian actress who appeared on Neighbours.

Neighbours
Dubois appeared as a recurring character on Neighbours.  She played the role of Kirsten Gannon in 2007–08.   She was nominated in the "Best Bitch" category at the "2008 Inside Soap Awards".

Other TV appearances
Last Man Standing (2005)
The Secret Life of Us (2003)
Blue Heelers unknown episodes

References

External links

Living people
Australian soap opera actresses
1977 births